Federico Brandt (17 May 1878 in Caracas – 25 July 1932 in Caracas) was a Venezuelan painter.

People from Caracas
1878 births
1932 deaths
20th-century Venezuelan painters
20th-century Venezuelan male artists
Male painters